Miss Monique, stage name of Olesia Arkusha (Алеся Аркуша in Cyrillic alphabet), born 1992, is a Ukrainian DJ. She became known in the electronic music world due to the creation of the YouTube channels called "Mind Games" and "MiMo Weekly", but also due to releases on labels such as Black Hole Recordings or Bonzai Progressive.

Biography

Performances 
Olesia Arkusha's career began in 2011 when she performed in Ukraine for two years. She and her partner figured her name would be too complicated for foreigners, and after considering several French names, they chose "Miss Monique". The year 2013 was marked by the creation of a radio show called Mind Games. The growth in her popularity allowed her to gain foreign listeners. Thanks to this, Miss Monique started to perform in several international concert halls, and in 2014 began a cooperation with the label Freegrant Music. The tracks released on this label were recognised by some of the world's major DJs, in particular Armin van Buuren, Paul van Dyk, Paul Oakenfold, Gareth Emery, and others. She gave over 100 performances in 2016 in Belgium, China, Mexico and Egypt. In 2019 she played in Cyprus, having previously held concerts in Ibiza, Hungary, Belarus, the Czech Republic and India. She continued her tours in 2022 in Argentina, Israel, Spain, Hungary and Florida, eventually having played in some forty countries since her debut.

Originally from Ukraine, she found her vocation at the beginning of the 2010s. Based in Kyiv, Miss Monique gradually made a name for herself and became one of the most recognised DJs in Eastern Europe. Miss Monique is also considered the most recognised female progressive house artist in Europe. Miss Monique is one of the 20 most popular Ukrainian pop stars. and her hit Way of the Wind was ranked the 14th best progressive house song of the year 2021. Some of her videos posted on YouTube routinely reach 500,000 views, and some up to two million views. By April 2019, her Radio Intense set had reached 13 million views. Her green-dyed hair remains a distinctive feature in her performances.

After the 2022 Russian invasion of Ukraine began on 24 February 2022, Miss Monique and her family spent the first two weeks sleeping in cars on the streets of Kyiv, then had to flee to Vinnytsia in early March, and a few days later out of the country. She described the Russian attack on her country as 'hell', and 'the hardest experience of my life'. After two months, Miss Monique returned to Kyiv as she felt bringing joy to people with her music was the best way to help her country; although her music did not change, she and her label Siona Records stopped supporting and working with Russian artists (who, to her surprise, seemed to carry on with business as usual as if the war did not exist). On 24 August 2022, Miss Monique and other Ukrainian DJs performed a fundraising rave concert in Vilnius, Lithuania to mark the Independence Day of Ukraine. Miss Monique said: 'This event in Vilnius will help not just to collect money for Ukrainians but remind the world that the war is not over. People are still dying and we must to do something together and stop Russia's terrorism.' Afterwards she stated that pro-Ukrainian support in Lithuania had been "amazing", with many people not just donating for humanitarian aid, but waving flags and wearing national dresses of Ukraine.

In October 2022, Miss Monique performed during the Cercle Festival at the Montreal Biosphere, where she premiered her new single "Concorde".

Label and style 
Miss Monique founded her own label 'Siona Records' in 2019.

Her musical style is an eclectic fusion of progressive house, techno, and trance.

Discography

Extended Play 
 2020 : Raindrop, on Siona Records
 2021 : Land Of Sunshine, on Purified Records

References

External links 
YouTube channel Miss Monique

Living people
1992 births
21st-century women musicians
Electronic dance music DJs
Ukrainian DJs
Ukrainian women record producers
Women in electronic music
Women DJs